Best Revenge is a 1984 Canadian film directed by John Trent from a story by David Rothberg. Originally entitled Misdeal the film was renamed following a delayed release. The film was panned for its similarity to Midnight Express.

Cast

References

External links 
 

1984 films
1980s crime films
Canadian crime drama films
English-language Canadian films
Films about the illegal drug trade
Films set in Morocco
Films set in Spain
Films directed by John Trent (director)
1980s Canadian films